We Are History is a British comedy series broadcast on the BBC. It ran for two series of six ten-minute episodes.

The series was a parody of historical and archaeological documentaries, especially those of the Time Team, Meet the Ancestors and Simon Schama. Marcus Brigstocke played dubious historian David Oxley, who would attempt to 'recreate' a number of historical events in a modern setting. In one episode, he recreated the Viking invasion of Britain in "the last bastion of Viking control" – an IKEA store. In another, he recreated the Spanish Armada in a swimming pool with children throwing foam balls at one another.

Much of the humour derived from Oxley's singular incompetence and stupidity. He seemed totally unaware of the facts of history and often made things up as he went along. Each episode had a general theme that offered a view of history totally at odds with the known facts – such as Camelot being buried underneath Heathrow Airport or the Norman invasion being a bunch of French visitors who overstayed their welcome and got carried away. In every episode, Oxley talked of "new evidence unearthed by local enthusiasts".

Episodes

Season 1, Episode 1: "Boadicea: Myth or Missus?"
Original Air Date: 3 April 2000

Season 1, Episode 2: "King Arthur: Myth or Legend?"
Original Air Date: 4 April 2000

Season 1, Episode 3: "Our Friends in the Norse"
Original Air Date: 10 April 2000

Season 1, Episode 4: "Hunchback!"
Original Air Date: 12 April 2000

Season 1, Episode 5: "Armada!"
Original Air Date: 14 April 2000

Season 1, Episode 6: "Oliver's Army"
Original Air Date: 17 April 2000

Season 2, Episode 1: "Conquered!"
Original Air Date: 25 September 2001

Season 2, Episode 2: "The Real Robin Hood"
Original Air Date: 2 October 2001

Season 2, Episode 3: "Fire"
Original Air Date: 9 October 2001

Season 2, Episode 4: "Bonnie Prince Charlie: Too Scot to Handle?"
Original Air Date: 16 October 2001

Season 2, Episode 5: "The Industrial Revolution: Factory or Friction?"
Original Air Date: 23 October 2001

Season 2, Episode 6: "Any Old Iron Age?"
Original Air Date: 30 October 2001

External links
 
We Are History at the former BBC Guide to Comedy

2000 British television series debuts
2001 British television series endings
2000s British comedy television series
BBC television comedy
British parody television series
English-language television shows